The Phoenix Trolley Museum, incorporated as the Arizona Street Railway Museum, is a railway museum established in 1975, with an emphasis on preserving historical street cars in Phoenix, Arizona, USA. The museum is "dedicated to the preservation of original Phoenix trolley cars and memorabilia, and to showing their place in the history of America's fifth largest city."

Overview
The museum was located next to the Margaret Hance Deck Park on Interstate 10 in downtown Phoenix until December 2017. In 2016, the City of Phoenix declined to renew the museum's lease for another five-year period, and the Hance Park location was closed.

In 2018, the museum relocated to a site in Phoenix's historic Grand Avenue Arts and Small Business district, along one of the earliest trolley lines in the city. The museum's volunteer board of directors is developing plans to renovate the existing vintage structure to house exhibits and offices, and to construct a new facility to house and refurbish trolleys under their stewardship. It is now raising the funds to do so.

In 2019, the Phoenix Trolley Museum's board of directors and volunteers organized a "spruce up campaign" to improve the building's exterior and interior exhibit spaces, including a significant overhaul of its exhibits.

After a successful fund-raising campaign in 2020, the museum was able to purchase the Grand Avenue property it has been occupying since 2018.

Discovery of Car 509
In December 2020, local businessman Mike Bystrom contacted the museum asking if they were interested in a storage unit that appeared to have been built around the body of a street car.
Upon research it was discovered that underneath an outer shell of sheet metal was in fact a street car thought to have been lost in the unfortunate trolley car barn fire in 1947 that 
destroyed all but the six street cars that were still out on runs late that night. Bystrom generously offered to donate the street car and pay to have it transported to the Grand Avenue 
site of the museum, where it sits today.

Museum features
 Restored Phoenix Street Railway Streetcar #116 is in storage.
 Phoenix Street Railway Car #504 (originally #108) is unrestored and is in storage.
 Phoenix Street Railway Car #509 was donated to the Phoenix Trolley Museum in December 2020. It is unrestored and on display.
An electric calcine locomotive donated by the (then) Phelps-Dodge Corporation from its Douglas, AZ facility is on display.
 Photographs, maps, and numerous items of historical interest are on display in the museum.

Museum gallery

See also
List of heritage railroads in the United States
Phoenix Street Railway

References

External links

Phoenix Trolley Museum website

1975 establishments in Arizona
Museums established in 1975
Railroad museums in Arizona
Museums in Phoenix, Arizona
Heritage railroads in Arizona
Street railway museums in the United States